Conus tenorioi is a species of sea snail, a marine gastropod mollusk in the family Conidae, the cone snails, cone shells or cones.

These snails are predatory and venomous. They are capable of "stinging" humans.

Description

Distribution
This marine species of cone snail occurs off in the Red Sea

References

 Monnier E., Monteiro A. & Limpalaër L. (2016). Phasmoconus (Phasmoconus) tenorioi (Gastropoda: Conidae), a new species from the Red Sea. Xenophora Taxonomy. 10: 14-24

tenorioi
Gastropods described in 2016